Ciarda Roșie is a district in southeastern Timișoara. In its beginnings, Ciarda Roșie was a Hungarian village that was formed in the interwar period around the Vörös Csárda inn ( "Red Inn"); later, this name was assigned to the entire district.

History 
During the mid-19th century, a gang of looters robbed travelers who entered the city from Moșnița. They were supposedly led by Hungarian outlaw Sándor Rózsa and often took refuge in a makeshift camp in what is now Ciarda Roșie. However, many historians dispute that Rózsa ever arrived in this area.

In the 1900s, several workers' houses began to be built around the inn. As the area was crossed by many travelers, the settlement developed rapidly. In that period, Ciarda Roșie belonged to Moșnița Nouă; it has had several names over time: Vöröscsárdatelep, Illéspuszta, Rotterpuszta. In 1937, the inhabitants of Ciarda Roșie requested the Prefecture its separation from Moșnița Nouă and subsequent annexation to Urseni under a new name – Stupari. The action never materialized. The village was annexed to the city in 1953, when it became the 10th constituency of Timișoara.

Transport 
  Bus: E2
  Tram: 4, 8, 9

References 

Districts of Timișoara